Mewa Shah Graveyard is located in SITE Town, Karachi, Sindh, Pakistan. The Mewa Shah Qabaristan (Cemetery), one of the largest and oldest graveyards of Karachi.

It is named after the  19th Century Sufi, Mewa Shah, was a Sufi and struggled against the British colonial rule in Karachi. He was jailed and eventually exiled by the British. According to the legend, Mewa Shah alighted the ship taking him into exile, said his prayers on the waves of the Arabian Sea and mounted a large fish which took him back to the shores of Karachi.

Notable figures
Kadu Makrani (real name being Qadir Baksh Rind Baloch) was executed by hanging in the Karachi Central Jail in November 1887. He was buried in Mewah Shah Graveyard. Makrani was a 19th-century insurgent who operated mainly in Kathiawar, Gujarat and was born and raised in Makran. He is famously known for opposing and resisting British rule and rule by the elite class of Gujarat in favor of the rights of the poor lower class, and is considered one of the significant freedom fighters against the British Raj.

Artist and the then Globally known "King of Water Colours", A.B Nazir aka Ahmed Buksh Nazir (1931–1961), is buried in this graveyard.

This graveyard is named after mewa shah because he had a park of mewa (dry fruits) which can be only be eaten in his park because if someone will take that mewa outside it will rot or will be rotten.

References

Cemeteries in Karachi